Svetlana Leontief Alpers (born February 10, 1936) is an American art historian, also a professor, writer and critic. Her specialty is Dutch Golden Age painting, a field she revolutionized with her 1984 book The Art of Describing.  She has also written on Tiepolo, Rubens, Bruegel, and Velázquez, among others.

Education and career
Svetlana Alpers received her B.A. from Radcliffe College in 1957 and a Ph.D.from Harvard in 1965. She was a professor of art history at the University of California, Berkeley from 1962 to 1998, and by 1994 she was named Professor Emerita.

In 1983, Alpers co-founded the interdisciplinary journal Representations with American literary critic Stephen Greenblatt.

In 2007, she collaborated with artists James Hyde and Barney Kulok on a project entitled Painting Then for Now.  The project consists of 19 photographic prints based on the suite of three paintings by Giambattista Tiepolo that hang at the top of the main staircase in the Metropolitan Museum of Art, New York. The project was exhibited at David Krut Gallery, NY. Six of the prints were later acquired for the permanent collection of the Museum of Modern Art in New York City.

Alpers was elected to the American Philosophical Society in 2011. In Spring 2014, she was made an officier de l'Ordre des Arts et des Lettres by the République Francaise. On May 28, 2015, she was awarded an honorary doctorate by Harvard University.

Critical responses
In a critical review of Rembrandt's Enterprise: The Studio and the Market, for conservative magazine The New Criterion, Hilton Kramer described it as an emblematic event "As far as the study of art history is concerned" and more particularly, what has gone wrong with it". He argues that it attacks Rembrandt for "having commodified himself by virtue of having painted and marketed his own self-portraits". He describes a debt to Fredric Jameson's "Postmodernism and Consumer Society", with "Professor Alpers's "Rembrandt" coming to resemble an artist like Andy Warhol, the most successful "entrepreneur of the self". He accuses Alpers of removing the greatest art categorically from the realm of aesthetics, using it as "just another counter in the dialectic of material culture. Such, too, is the dismal fate of art history when the study of art is no longer its primary concern."

Personal life
Svetlana Leontief was born in Cambridge, Massachusetts. She was the only child of Wassily Leontief, a political refugee from the Soviet Union and Nobel laureate economist who pioneered computer modeling, and the poet Estelle Marks. In 1958, she married and changed her surname to Alpers.

Honors 
 Phi Beta Kappa
 Woodrow Wilson Fellowship, 1957-8
 Kathryn McHale Fellowship, American Association of University Women, 1961-2
 Guggenheim Fellowship, 1972-3
 Fellow, Center for Advanced Study in the Behavioral Sciences, Stanford University, 1975-6
 Fellow, American Council of Learned Societies, 1978
 Visiting Fellow, Netherlands Institute for Advanced Study (NIAS), Wassenaar, 1979
 Member, Institute for Advanced Study, Princeton, New Jersey, 1979–80
 Eugene M. Kayden Humanities Award for "The Art of Describing," 1983 
 Distinguished Teaching Award, Berkeley, 1986
 Visiting Scholar, Getty Research Institute, California, 1987–88
 Director of Studies, Ecole des Hautes Etudes en Sciences Sociales, Paris, 1991
 Fellow of the American Academy of Arts and Sciences, 1991
 Fellow, Institute for Advanced Study, Berlin, 1992–93
 Honorary Doctor, Courtauld Institute of Art, London, 2009 
 Visiting critic, New York University Institute of Fine Arts
 Corresponding Fellow of the British Academy (2014)

Selected publications
 The Decoration of the Torre de la Parada, Corpus Rubenianum Ludwig Burchard, Brussels/London: Phaidon, 1971. (A revision of Alpers' 1965 doctoral dissertation.)
 The Art of Describing: Dutch Art in the Seventeenth Century, Chicago: University of Chicago Press, 1983
Rembrandt's Enterprise: The Studio and the Market, Chicago: University of Chicago Press, 1988
"The Museum as a Way of Seeing" in Exhibiting Cultures: The Poetics and Politics of Museum Display, Washington: Smithsonian Institution Press, 1991.
Tiepolo and the Pictorial Intelligence, New Haven and London: Yale University Press, 1994 (with Michael Baxandall)
The Making of Rubens, New Haven and London: Yale University Press, 1995.
The Vexations of Art: Velázquez and Others, New Haven and London: Yale University Press, 2005.
Roof Life, New Haven and London: Yale University Press, 2013.
Tuilages, Trocy-en-Multien: Editions de la revue Conférence, 2015. (Translated by Pierre-Emmanuel Dauzat.) 
Walker Evans: Starting from Scratch, Princeton: Princeton University Press, 2020.

References

Sources
Bowman, John S. Cambridge Dictionary of American Biography. (Cambridge: Cambridge University Press, 1995) p. 14.

1936 births
Living people
Writers from Cambridge, Massachusetts
American art historians
University of California, Berkeley College of Letters and Science faculty
Institute for Advanced Study visiting scholars
Fellows of the American Academy of Arts and Sciences
Corresponding Fellows of the British Academy
American women historians
Women art historians
Radcliffe College alumni
Scholars of Netherlandish art
Scholars of Dutch art
Historians from Massachusetts
Historians from California
21st-century American women